Scooby-Doo and the Cyber Chase is a 2001 American direct-to-video animated science fiction comedy mystery film, and the fourth in a series of direct-to-video animated films based on the Scooby-Doo franchise. It was released on October 9, 2001. The film was produced by Hanna-Barbera Cartoons. In spite of its grimmer atmosphere, it also has a lighter tone, similar to its predecessor, Scooby-Doo and the Alien Invaders.

It is the final Hanna-Barbera production to be executive produced by both William Hanna and Joseph Barbera before Hanna's death on March 22, 2001 and was dedicated in his memory. It is also the fourth and final Scooby-Doo direct-to-video film to be animated overseas by Japanese animation studio Mook Animation, and the first film to use digital ink and paint. This film, along with Aloha, Scooby-Doo!, was part of the first Scooby-Doo films to be re-released on Blu-ray on April 5, 2011.

This was also the first film to feature Grey DeLisle as the voice of Daphne Blake after the death of Mary Kay Bergman in 1999. It was also the last film where Scott Innes voiced Scooby-Doo and Shaggy, as well as the last film where B. J. Ward voiced Velma.

The Scooby-Doo direct-to-video films would not feature real supernatural creatures again until Scooby-Doo! and the Goblin King.

Plot
Mystery Inc. visits their old friend and college student, Eric, who has invited them to see a prize-winning computer game he made based on their adventures and a high-tech laser, both of which intends to enter at a campus science fair. Upon arrival, the gang learn a "Phantom Virus" materialized from Eric's game and attacked him before his teacher, Professor Kaufman, drove it off with a high-powered magnet and that it has been terrorizing the campus ever since. While investigating potential suspects Eric; Kaufman; Bill, Eric's best friend and baseball-loving programmer; and grumpy campus security guard, Officer Wembley, the gang encounter the Phantom Virus before someone uses Eric's laser to beam them all into his game, where the gang learn that they must complete every level by finding a box of Scooby Snax to get out of the game.

Following initial difficulties in the first three levels, the gang progress quickly until they reach the final level, where they meet cyber-versions of themselves. After escaping from the Phantom Virus, the cyber-gang reveal that they know where to locate the final box of Scooby Snax, and lead the original gang to an amusement park, where they battle real versions of monsters that Mystery Inc. have previously faced and unmasked as human criminals. Eventually, Scooby-Doo's cyber-double distracts the Phantom Virus so the original Scooby can grab the last box of Scooby Snax, deleting the Phantom Virus and returning the gang to the real world. Using baseball-related clues they found and phrases the Phantom Virus used during their adventure, they reveal Bill as its creator. Following a failed escape attempt, he is arrested by Wembley and reveals that he was jealous that Eric's video game was chosen for the science fair over his even though he had been at the school two years longer, so he created the Phantom Virus to scare Eric away and claim the prize money for himself. Fearing that Mystery Inc. would discover he had created the virus, he beamed them into cyberspace in the hope that they would not survive. Afterwards, the gang and Eric go to a local restaurant to celebrate and reunite with the cyber-gang.

In a post-credits scene, the gang tells the audience what their favorite parts of the film were.

Voice cast
 Scott Innes as Scooby-Doo and Shaggy Rogers
 Frank Welker as Fred Jones
 Grey DeLisle as Daphne Blake
 B.J. Ward as Velma Dinkley
 Joe Alaskey as Officer Wembley
 Bob Bergen as Eric Staufer
 Tom Kane as Professor Kaufman
 Mikey Kelley as Bill McLemore
 Gary Sturgis as The Phantom Virus

Production
Scooby-Doo and the Cyber Chase is the fourth direct-to-video Scooby feature, and was the last for the original team that worked on the first four films. The team was led by Davis Doi, and included Glenn Leopold, Jim Stenstrum, Lance Falk, and others. They had previously clashed with studio executives who suggested outside screenwriters for the second Scooby film, Witch's Ghost. For Cyber Chase, it was the same situation: executives recommended Mark Turosz, a writer already under contract with Warner Bros. who had little experience with animation. The crew had produced the first Scooby film, Zombie Island, as well as the third, Alien Invaders, with total autonomy, and were insulted by Warner's insistence that they use Turosz's script.

The team were particularly critical of Turosz's draft of the script, which according to Falk was considered a regression in terms of the franchise's potential. They felt its pacing and plot line were unsatisfactory. In addition, it was reportedly poorly formatted and unfamiliar with the animation process. For example, the script included complicated camera moves impossible to do with their budget, as well as countless locales that would prove tedious to design. As a result, the original team moved onto other projects after the film's completion. The next Scooby feature, Legend of the Vampire, was also written by Turosz.

Stenstrum initially suggested they explore using live-action actors for scenes set inside the video game, though the idea was quickly dropped. Out of the first four films, Cyber Chase features the largest array of storyboard artist credits, as the team were under significant time constraints and required additional help. Cyber Chase was also the last Scooby film to feature animation produced at Japanese studio Mook Animation.

Reception
Despite having a lack of critical consensus and reviews, the film has a 60% approval on Rotten Tomatoes, based on five reviews. Common Sense Media gave the film a two out of five stars, saying, "The gang's trapped in a video game; peril, cartoon violence."

Home media
Scooby-Doo and the Cyber Chase was released October 9, 2001 for both VHS and DVD formats. The film was re-released on Blu-ray on March 29, 2011. This was the first animated Scooby-Doo film to be produced in the high-definition format.

Video game

A video game based on the film was released by THQ in 2001 for the PlayStation and Game Boy Advance. This is the first Scooby-Doo video game to be on a sixth-generation handheld.

References

External links

 
 
 

2001 films
2001 animated films
2001 direct-to-video films
2000s American animated films
2000s monster movies
American children's animated comic science fiction films
American children's animated science fantasy films
American children's animated mystery films
Warner Bros. Animation animated films
Warner Bros. direct-to-video animated films
Films set in universities and colleges
Films about video games
Films about virtual reality
Films directed by Jim Stenstrum
Films scored by Louis Febre
Scooby-Doo direct-to-video animated films
2000s children's animated films
2000s English-language films